Southland Mall is a regional shopping mall in the Whitehaven neighborhood of South Memphis, Tennessee. It was built in 1966, becoming the first enclosed mall in the Mid-South. It is managed and owned by Namdar Realty Group. There are over 60 stores. There are two vacant anchors last occupied by Macy's and Sears.

On January 9, 2015, it was announced that Macy's would be closing as part of a plan to close 14 stores nationwide. The store closed in early Spring 2015.

On November 8, 2018, it was announced that Sears would also be closing in February 2019 as part of a plan to close 40 stores nationwide which left the mall with no anchors.

See also
List of shopping malls in Tennessee

References 

http://wreg.com/2015/01/09/concerns-and-frustrations-over-macys-closing-in-southland-mall/

External links
Southland Mall

Namdar Realty Group
Shopping malls in Tennessee
Shopping malls established in 1966
Buildings and structures in Memphis, Tennessee
Tourist attractions in Memphis, Tennessee
1966 establishments in Tennessee